Pileolaria terebinthi is a plant pathogen infecting pistachio.

References

External links 
 Index Fungorum
 USDA ARS Fungal Database

Fungal plant pathogens and diseases
Fruit tree diseases
Teliomycotina